Jennifer Berry-Gooden (born July 18, 1983) is an American beauty pageant titleholder who was crowned Miss America on January 21, 2006.  A resident of Tulsa, Oklahoma, at the time of her investment to sovereignty of beauty, she became the fifth Miss America from Oklahoma to have held the title.

Early life and education
Berry was born in Houston, Texas. She graduated from Jenks High School in 2001, and attended the University of Oklahoma with a major in elementary education. She expressed hopes to attain a Master's in education and become an elementary school teacher after her reign as Miss America.

Pageants

Miss Oklahoma 2005
She won the Miss Oklahoma 2005 title in a state pageant held Tulsa on June 11, 2005.  She competed as Miss Grand Lake and was a double preliminary winner, winning awards for both talent and swimsuit.  This was Berry's fifth attempt at the state title, as she placed third runner-up in 2004 and 2003, made the top 10 in 2002 and was unplaced in 2001.

Miss America 2006
Berry represented Oklahoma in the Miss America 2006 pageant broadcast from the Theatre for the Performing Arts on the Las Vegas Strip during January 21, 2006, the first occasion the pageant was held outside of Atlantic City, New Jersey.  During the preliminary competitions Berry won a preliminary talent award for her ballet en pointe performance.  At the end of the final night of competition, which involved interview, swimsuit, evening gown and talent competitions, Berry won the Miss America 2006 title, the first titleholder to be crowned outside Atlantic City.

Her platform issue as Miss Oklahoma and Miss America was "Building Intolerance to Drunk Driving and Underage Drinking."  She acted as a national spokesperson for Mothers Against Drunk Driving during her reign, and also worked on behalf of numerous other charities.  Berry also had the opportunity to host the second annual Miss America's Outstanding Teen pageant held in Orlando, Florida.

Personal life
She is a member of the Churches of Christ. She currently lives in Seattle, Washington. On April 28, 2007, she married Nathan Gooden in her hometown of Tulsa.

References

External links 
 Miss America 2006
 Miss Oklahoma 2005

1983 births
Living people
American members of the Churches of Christ
Miss America winners
Miss America 2006 delegates
People from Houston
People from Tulsa, Oklahoma
University of Oklahoma alumni
Miss America Preliminary Talent winners